The Trigonopterygidae are an insect family in the Orthoptera: Caelifera found in south and south-east Asia.

Subfamilies and Genera
The Orthoptera Species File includes two sub-families:
 Borneacridinae Kevan, 1952
Distribution: W. Malesia
 Borneacris monotypic B. mirabilis Ramme, 1941
 Moultonia monotypic M. violacea Bolívar, 1914
 Trigonopteryginae Walker, 1870
 Pseudopyrgus monotypic P. curtipennis Kevan, 1966 (Borneo)
 Systella Westwood, 1841
 Trigonopteryx Charpentier, 1841

References

External links
 
 
 

Caelifera
Orthoptera families